A West Indian is a native or inhabitant of the West Indies (the Antilles and the Lucayan Archipelago). For more than 100 years the words West Indian specifically described natives of the West Indies, but by 1661 Europeans had begun to use it also to describe the descendants of European colonists who stayed in the West Indies. Some West Indian people reserve this term for citizens or natives of the British West Indies.

See also 
 Caribbean people
 History of colonialism
 History of the West Indian cricket team
 Spanish colonization of the Americas
 West Indian American

References

Further reading 
 
 
 

Caribbean people
Demonyms